One Hundred Poems From the Chinese is a collection of translations of Chinese poetry by Kenneth Rexroth, first published in 1956. The book is in two parts: the first contains 35 poems by Du Fu, while the second consists of works by assorted Song dynasty poets. The book actually contains over one-hundred poems.

See also
Classical Chinese poetry

Notes

References
Rexroth, Kenneth, 1970. Love and the Turning Year: One Hundred More Poems from the Chinese. New York: New Directions.

Chinese poetry collections